Mohit Raina (born 14 August 1982) is an Indian actor who appears in Hindi films and television. He started his acting career with a science fiction show  Antariksh (2004) and later went on to play a role in Don Muthu Swami (2008). He is best known for the lead role of the Hindu god Shiva in the television series Devon Ke Dev – Mahadev and Mahabharat, prior to which he had acted in television soap operas including Chehra (2009) and Ganga Kii Dheej (2010).

Early life and background
Mohit Raina was born into a Kashmiri Brahmin family on 14 August 1982 to P.L. Raina and Sushma Kumara and raised in Jammu. He was educated at Kendriya Vidyalaya School, Jammu and earned a bachelor of Commerce degree from University of Jammu. He moved to Mumbai to begin a career in modelling. He hoped that modelling would provide him with a route into acting work and lost  from his teenage weight of  so that he could participate in the 2005 Grasim Mister India modelling contest. He was placed among the top five contestants in that competition.

Career
Mohit's acting career began in 2004 with a science fiction TV show called Antariksh. In 2008, he starred as Jai Kishan in the comedy film Don Muthu Swami, which was not a success at the box office and caused him to return to television work. In 2009 he appeared in the Chehra TV series, a suspense drama revolving around a disabled girl. Mohit played her husband Garv, a young business tycoon. He was also part of Bandini.

In 2011, he was cast as the lead in Nikhil Sinha's Devon Ke Dev – Mahadev. The series focused on the god Shiva and portrays his journey from a hermit to a householder through his marriage to Sati and later to Parvati. Mohit worked on improving his physique for the role, and started learning the Indian classical dance form Kathak, which is integral part of his role as Shiva. The Times of India said the role created fans due to his "fab abs, groovy smile and acting chops" He played over 30 different characters in the series, which ran for three years, ending in December 2014, by which time Mohit had become a celebrity.

Mohit has played the adult emperor Ashoka, in the historical serial Chakravartin Ashoka Samrat on Colors TV. The series started broadcasting from 2 May 2016.
After Ashoka, Mohit also played the lead role as Havildar Ishar Singh in 21 Sarfarosh - Saragarhi 1897 which is based on the Battle of Saragarhi.

Mohit played the role of Major Karan Kashyap in the Bollywood film Uri: The Surgical Strike, released on 11 January 2019.

He made his web debut with the ZEE5 web series Kaafir, starring opposite Dia Mirza.

Mohit Raina is playing the character of Dr. Kaushik Oberoi the series Mumbai Diaries 26/11. The show is created by Nikkhil Advani and produced by Emmay Entertainment. It also stars Konkana Sen Sharma, Tina Desai, and Shreya Dhanwanthary.

Personal life
On 1 January 2022, Raina revealed that he had married his longtime girlfriend Aditi Sharma. The couple had their first child, a baby girl on 17 March 2023.

Filmography

Films

Television

Web series

Awards and nominations

See also 

 List of Indian television actors
 List of Indian film actors

References

External links

 
 
 

Living people
1982 births
Indian male television actors
Indian male models
Indian male film actors
Male actors in Hindi cinema
People from Jammu (city)
21st-century Indian male actors